George Broadbent (born 30 September 2000) is an English professional footballer who plays as a midfielder for Boreham Wood on loan from Sheffield United.

Career
Broadbent played for the youth teams of Curzon Ashton from 2005 to 2010. He joined Sheffield United in July 2017 after playing in the youth academy of Manchester United. In January 2020, he rejoined National League North side Curzon Ashton on loan. On 11 January 2021, he joined Belgian First Division A side Beerschot on loan until the end of the season. Six days later, he made his professional debut, coming on as a substitute for the final minutes in a 3–0 loss to Club Brugge.

On 3 August 2021, Broadbent joined Rochdale on loan until January. 

On 23 September 2022, Broadbent joined National League club Boreham Wood on a short-term loan deal. In January 2023, the loan was extended until the end of the season.

Career statistics

References

Living people
Association football midfielders
2000 births
English footballers
Sheffield United F.C. players
Curzon Ashton F.C. players
K Beerschot VA players
Rochdale A.F.C. players
Boreham Wood F.C. players
National League (English football) players
Belgian Pro League players
English expatriate footballers
Expatriate footballers in Belgium
English expatriate sportspeople in Belgium